Njoro is an agricultural town 18 km west south west of Nakuru, Kenya situated on the western rim of the Rift Valley. Njoro town was the headquarters of the former Njoro District, hived off Nakuru District. Since 2010, when Njoro District was eliminated, it has been part of the Nakuru County.

Geography 
Njoro is 2423 meters above sea level.
Njoro is a station on the meter gauge railway line between Nakuru and Kisumu.

Brief history 
The town was first settled by the pastoralist tribes, Kalenjins and Maasai, before the arrival of British settlers to the Kenya highlands. Over the years the town grew to be an important center in agricultural research, education and development. The town is home to a campus of the Kenya Agricultural Research Institute (KARI) and Egerton University is situated 5 km south from the town center.
Njoro was temporarily a district on its own in Rift Valley province. The population is rising due to the fact that peace is prevailing, unlike the neighbouring towns like Molo; Mau Narok, and Likia. It is near the Mau Forest, which has become a global issue on environment.

Economy 
The main economic activities are agribased industries including vegetable and milk processing, large-scale wheat and barley farming green house flower farming. Light manufacturing industries such as timber milling, canning,and quarrying are also a mainstay of the local economy. The economic growth of the town has been slowed due to its proximity to the provincial capital, Nakuru.
Tourism has a minor but important role in the local economy. The town is part of the south Rift tourist circuit as it is on the way to the famed Masai Mara National Park. Tourists can visit the Lord Egerton Castle, which is run and maintained as a visitor and conference center by Egerton University which Lord Egerton founded as Egerton Agricultural College in the mid 1930s they can also visit kembu cottages. The town also boasts of a top golf course from Njoro Country Club and pharmaceutical facility.

People 

Njoro is populated by people from all ethnic groups in Kenya and was a peaceful area during the Mau Mau troubles of the 1950s. However, the Kikuyu are now the predominant people, and thus have greatly influenced the culture of the area. Residents of Njoro lived peacefully until the politically instigated tribal clashes of the 1990s. Several people were killed and many displaced due to the laxity of the Moi regime to maintain law and order. Issues arising from the displacement of local residents and their desired resettlement have continued to cause friction. It is the fastest growing town in Nakuru county with a lot of investment within it. The area is well equipped with agriculture having the effect from KARI and Egerton University.

See also 

 Railway stations in Kenya

Nakuru County
Populated places in Rift Valley Province